John Brant may refer to:
John Brant (Mohawk leader) (1794–1832), son of Joseph Brant
John Brant (author), writes on the subject of software architecture
John Brant (sportswriter), author of Duel in the Sun 
Jon Brant (born 1955), American bass player